Elaine Powell (born August 9, 1975) is an American assistant coach for the Georgia Southern Eagles and former professional basketball player. A point guard born in Monroe, Louisiana, she played in the WNBA from 1999 to 2008.

College career
In two years at LSU, Powell averaged 19.1 points per game (fourth in school history). She finished her career as LSU's 11th all-time leading scorer (1,163 points).

ABL career
Powell was drafted 20th overall in the 1997 ABL draft by the Portland Power. Powell was the starting point guard for the team.

WNBA career
After the ABL folded, Powell was drafted 50th overall in the 1999 WNBA Draft by the Orlando Miracle. Half way through the 2002 WNBA season she was traded to the Detroit Shock in exchange for Wendy Palmer. In November 2005, Powell was selected by the Chicago Sky in the expansion draft. During the 2006 WNBA season, she was waived by the Sky. Four days later, the Detroit Shock signed her as a free agent. During the 2008 WNBA season (when not injured), Powell started all 16 of the games she played. She shot 49% from the field (second best in career).

References

1975 births
Living people
American women's basketball players
Basketball players from Louisiana
Chicago Sky players
Detroit Shock players
Junior college women's basketball players in the United States
LGBT basketball players
LGBT people from Louisiana
Lesbian sportswomen
LSU Lady Tigers basketball players
Orlando Miracle players
Point guards
Portland Power players
Sportspeople from Monroe, Louisiana